
Gmina Wierzbinek is a rural gmina (administrative district) in Konin County, Greater Poland Voivodeship, in west-central Poland.

Villages
Gmina Wierzbinek contains the villages and settlements of: 
 
 Boguszyce
 Boguszyczki
 Broniszewo
 Cegielnia-Rudki
 Chlebowo
 Chrząszczewo
 Ciepłowo
 Dębowiec
 Dobra Wola
 Dziadoch
 Florianowo
 Gaj
 Galczyce
 Galczyczki
 Goczki Polskie
 Helenowo
 Janinów
 Janowice
 Janowo Racięckie
 Julianowo
 Kalina
 Katarzynowo
 Kazimierowo
 Kazimierzewo
 Kazubek
 Kolonia Racięcka
 Kryszkowice
 Krzymowo
 Kwiatkowo
 Leszczyc
 Łysek
 Łysek-Sosnówka
 Majdany
 Mąkoszyn
 Mielno
 Morzyczyn
 Noć
 Nockie Holendry
 Nowa Ruda
 Nowiny Kryszkowskie
 Nykiel
 Obory
 Ostrówek
 Ostrowo
 Pagórki
 Palmowo
 Pamiątka
 Paradowo
 Posada
 Racięcin
 Romanowo
 Ruszkówek
 Ruszkowo-Parcel
 Rybno
 Sadlno
 Słomkowo
 Stanisławowo
 Stara Ruda
 Stefanowo Racięckie
 Straszewo
 Sumin
 Suskowo
 Synogać
 Talarkowo
 Teodorowo
 Teresewo
 Tomaszewo
 Tomisławice
 Walerianowo
 Wandzinowo
 Wierzbinek
 Wilcza Kłoda
 Witkowice
 Władysławowo
 Wojciechowo
 Wójcinek
 Zaborowo
 Zakrzewek
 Zamość
 Zaryń
 Zielonka
 Ziemięcin
 Złotowo
 Żółwiniec
 Żychlinek

Neighbouring gminas
Gmina Wierzbinek is bordered by the gminas of Babiak, Piotrków Kujawski, Skulsk, Ślesin, Sompolno and Topólka.

References
 Polish official population figures 2006

Wierzbinek
Konin County